The yellow-billed nunbird (Monasa flavirostris) is a species of near-passerine bird in the family Bucconidae, the puffbirds, nunlets, and nunbirds. It is found in Bolivia, Brazil, Colombia, Ecuador, and Peru.

Taxonomy and systematics

The yellow-billed nunbird is monotypic.

Description

The adult is mostly sooty black, with the belly tending to very dark gray and the tail being greenish black. The lesser wing coverts are mostly white and show as white spots on the closed wing. The bill is yellow and noticeably shorter than those of the other members of its genus. Its eye is dark and the feet blackish. Immatures are a slightly duller black than adults and the white areas are not as prominent.

Distribution and habitat

The yellow-billed nunbird is found in two areas of the upper Amazon Basin. One extends from southeastern Colombia through eastern Ecuador into northern Peru. The other includes eastern Peru, northern Bolivia, and western Brazil as far east as the upper Purus River. The species inhabits somewhat open landscapes such as transitional forest, secondary forest, the edges of terra firme forest, and regenerating clearings with scattered trees. It occurs from the understory to the subcanopy. In Ecuador is extends locally as high as  but is usually below .

Behavior

Feeding

The yellow-billed nunbird's feeding behavior and diet have not been extensively studied. It appears to hunt by sallies from a high exposed perch, catching its prey in the air. Its diet is assumed to be mostly insects like those of other nunbirds.

Breeding

Nothing has been documented of the yellow-billed nunbird's breeding phenology.

Vocalization

The yellow-billed nunbird's song "consists of full melodious lengthy phrases in choruses, typically including a frequently repeated 'wheekit-wheeyk, wheekit-wheeyk...'."

Status

The IUCN has assessed the yellow-billed nunbird as being of Least Concern. Though its population has not been enumerated, it is believed to be stable. It is apparently rather rare throughout its range, though it might be undercounted due to its unobtrusive habits.

References

yellow-billed nunbird
Birds of the Amazon Basin
Birds of the Colombian Amazon
Birds of the Ecuadorian Amazon
Birds of the Peruvian Amazon
Birds of the Bolivian Amazon
yellow-billed nunbird
Taxonomy articles created by Polbot